The Anymachen Tibetan Culture Center is a school for boys in Qinghai China. It was founded in Zhandetan, a remote rural area near the town of Tawo Zholma, (Xiadawu) in Maqên County of the Golog Tibetan Autonomous Prefecture at the foot of a mountain glacier of the Amne Machin, by Tserin Lhagyal, Rinpoche of Guri Monastery, in the Nyingma tradition, who patiently cultivated Chinese officials over a period of years and gained permission to establish the school. Donations totaling $3 million were raised throughout China with 80% of the funds being donated by Han people who support Tibetan Buddhism. The small student body, young Tibetans from rural backgrounds, some orphans, study Tibetan language and culture, as well as Mandarin and English. A girls schools required fundraising and a separate building. As of 2016, both boys and girls were in attendance at the school.

Notes

External links and further reading
Qinghai Journey

Tibetan culture
Education in Tibet
Buildings and structures in Tibet